Tahereh Mafi (November 9, 1988) is an American author based in Santa Monica, California. She is known for writing young adult fiction.

Early life
Mafi was born on November 9, 1988, in a small town in Connecticut. She is the youngest child of her family and has four older brothers. Mafi's parents are immigrants from Iran. At age 12 she moved with her family to Northern California and at age 14 they moved to Orange County.

Mafi graduated from University High School in Irvine, California. She later graduated from Soka University of America in Aliso Viejo, California. She has varying levels of competency in eight different languages. She studied abroad in Barcelona, Spain for a semester in college. During this trip she had the opportunity to be fully immersed in the Spanish language.

Career 
Mafi stated that before writing her first novel, Shatter Me, she wrote five manuscripts in order to better understand how to write a book.

Shatter Me was published on November 15, 2011. Since then, Unravel Me (published on February 5, 2013) and Ignite Me (published on February 4, 2014) have been released. Mafi also has two novellas that go with the Shatter Me series, Destroy Me and Fracture Me. Film rights to Shatter Me have been purchased by 20th Century Fox.

In August 2016 Mafi released Furthermore, a middle-grade fiction novel about a pale girl living in a world of great color and magic of which she has none.

In April 2017, Mafi announced another trilogy in the Shatter Me universe following the same cast of characters. The first installment, Restore Me, is told from a dual-POV from Juliette Ferrars and Warner, the protagonist and antagonist, respectively, in the original trilogy. Restore Me was published on March 6, 2018.

Mafi's next book, A Very Large Expanse of Sea, was released on October 16, 2018. It was longlisted for the  2018 National Book Award for Young People's Literature.

Personal life
Mafi currently resides in Irvine, California, where she continues to write. She is Muslim. In 2013 she married author Ransom Riggs. In March 2017, Mafi announced via Twitter that she was pregnant. She gave birth to a daughter, Layla, on 30 May 2017.

Bibliography

The Shatter Me series 

Shatter Me (2011)
Unravel Me (2013)
Ignite Me (2014)
Restore Me (2018)
Defy Me (2019)
Imagine Me (2020

Novellas

Destroy Me (2012)
Fracture Me (2013)
Shadow Me (2019)
Reveal Me (2019)
Believe Me (2021) 

Furthermore series

Furthermore (2016)
Whichwood (2017)

This Woven Kingdom series

This Woven Kingdom (2022)
These Infinite Threads (Coming 2023)

Standalones

A Very Large Expanse of Sea (2018)
An Emotion of Great Delight (2021)

Compilations

Unite Me (2014) (Compilation of Destroy Me and Fracture Me)
Find Me (2019) (Compilation of Shadow Me and Reveal Me)

References

External links

21st-century American novelists
21st-century American women writers
American women novelists
American young adult novelists
American science fiction writers
Women science fiction and fantasy writers
American writers of Iranian descent
Soka University of America alumni
Novelists from California
People from Irvine, California
1988 births
Living people